Kokkini Milia (Greek: Κόκκινη Μηλιά, meaning: Red Apple Tree) according to the Greek people’s traditions, is a legendary place to which the Turks will be expelled from Constantinople, modern day Istanbul. According to the legend, after the liberation of the former-Byzantine capital, a "Marbled King" will ascend the throne and worship at the church of Hagia Sophia.

According to the folklore research conducted by Nikolaos Politis, the Red Apple Tree corresponds to Monodendrio of the pre-Fall Byzantine oracles and prophecies said during the dangerous sieges faced by Constantinople. However, how and when Monodendrio was replaced by the Red Apple Tree and what the latter was based on remains unknown.

It is likely relevant to the Turkish legend of the Red Apple (Kızıl Elma), which symbolizes the ultimate goal of conquest. Constantinople was first labelled as the Red Apple, followed by Rome, Vienna and Moscow.

The legend and the term are also used in modern times. Left and right-wing nationalists who fear a break-up of Turkey if it joins the European Union call themselves the "Red Apple Coalition". In early 2018, the legend was invoked by Turkish President Recep Tayyip Erdoğan during the Turkish military operation against Kurds in Syria’s Afrin Region.

References

Geography of the Byzantine Empire
Constantinople
Proverbs